The Eyachtal Span is the crossing of the Eyach valley with a 110 kV line in Neuenbürg and Höfen an der Enz in the Black Forest in Germany. The Eyachtal Span was built in 1992. With a span of 1444 metres, it is the greatest span of a power line in Germany. The pylons on which the Eyach Span is fixed are 70 metres high and located on Heuberg and Eiberg.

External links

 

Powerline river crossings
Electric power transmission systems in Germany